The 1953 Individual Speedway World Championship was the eighth edition of the official World Championship to determine the world champion rider.

Welshman Freddie Williams became the second rider to win a second title in front of a 90,000 attendance at Wembley Stadium. Williams won 4 of his 5 races, only dropping one point in heat 13 to Jeff Lloyd. Geoff Mardon defeated Olle Nygren in the bronze medal ride off.

Qualification

Nordic Final
31 May 1953
 Oslo
 First 8 to Continental final

Continental Final
21 June 1953
 Kumla
 First 8 to Championship Round

Championship Round

Venues
9 events in Great Britain.

Scores
Top 16 qualify for World final, 17th-20th reserves for World final

World final
17 September 1953
 London, Wembley Stadium

Classification

References

1953
Speedway
1953 in London
1953 in British motorsport
Speedway competitions in the United Kingdom